Valindeh, also rendered as Valendeh may refer to:
 Valindeh-ye Olya
 Valindeh-ye Sofla